An Institute of Technology (IT) is a type of higher education college found in Ireland. There are a total of fourteen colleges that use the title of Institute of Technology, which were created from the late 1960s and were formerly known as Regional Technical Colleges. The exception to this was Dublin Institute of Technology which emerged independently of the Regional College system.

Creation 
The idea of the institutions was first announced by Patrick Hillery in 1963. A year later, a site for an institution in Carlow was identified.

The Investment in Education (1962) and Training of Technicians in Ireland (1964) reports greatly accelerated the trend in Ireland for education reform and development particularly in technical education, similar to that in other Western countries at the time.

The Training of Technicians in Ireland (1964) report identified significant skills gaps, including:

a further serious difficulty in the task of raising the standards of technicians in Ireland is the lack of a nationally recognised technician diploma. The absence of such a diploma deters many parents from considering sub-professional technician careers for their children

The Steering Committee on Technical Education, also called The Mulcahy Report (1967), was an important milestone in framing the institutional structures and functions calling for:

we believe that the long-term function of the colleges will be to educate for trade and industry over a broad spectrum of occupations ranging from craft to professional, notably in engineering and science but also in commercial, linguistic and other specialities. They will, however, be more immediately concerned with providing courses aimed at filling gaps in the industrial manpower structure, particularly in the technician area

we do not foresee any final fixed pattern of courses in the colleges. If they are to make their most effective contribution to the needs of society and the economy, they must be capable of continuing adaptation to social, economic and technological changes. Initiative at local and national levels will largely determine how far this vital characteristic is developed. We are concerned that the progress of these colleges should not be deterred by any artificial limitation of either the scope or the level of their educational achievements

The building programme commenced in 1968, with the first institutions formally opened their doors in 1970, and other colleges were added during the following decade. Some colleges developed from earlier institutions and colleges, involving amalgamation, but most were completely new institutions. A Regional Technical College for Limerick was cancelled after a National Institute for Higher Education was announced for the city. Finally, in 1993, CoACT (College of Art, Commerce and Technology) became Limerick RTC. Two additional institutions were created since then, bringing the total to thirteen, before the amalgamation of three into Ireland's first Technological University, TU Dublin, reducing the total to eleven.

†With the constituent Colleges originally established in 1887, Dublin Institute of Technology was reestablished in 1992. It was the first third level college to be called an Institute of Technology and was created under separate legislation with different powers than the other thirteen colleges. This includes the awarding of its own degrees up to doctorate level.

*LIT traces its roots back to the 1852 foundation of the School of Ornamental Art on Leamy Street. For much of the history of the institute, it was constituted as the Municipal Technical Institute, before becoming the Limerick College of Art, Commerce and Technology (Limerick CoACT) in 1980, a Regional Technical College in 1993 and an Institute of Technology in 1997.

Legislation 

The institutions were run under Section 21 (2) of the Vocational Education Acts from 1970 until 1992 as special subcommittees of the Vocational Education Committees, and placed on an independent basis thereafter by the Regional Technical Colleges Acts in 1993. In the late 1990s, all of the institutions were upgraded to Institute of Technology status. This was in recognition of the high standards, including university level research, which takes place at them. The institutes are governed by the Institutes of Technology Acts 1992 to 2006.  Having been given delegated authority to confer their own awards in some cases up to Doctoral level by HETAC from 2001 onwards, in 2019 the institutes were designated as awarding bodies up to masters level in their own right.

Management 

The individual institutions are structured similar to other universities, particularly Irish ones. Each institution has a Director, who is the chief operational officer of the institution, usually assisted by an ad-hoc senior management team; a Registrar, who is the chief academic officer of the institution; a Governing Council, which oversees operational affairs; an Academic Council, which oversees academic affairs. Each academic school has a Head of School and each academic department of a school has a Head of Department.

Programmes 

The institutions traditional courses were National Certificate and National Diploma type courses particularly in business, engineering and science, this was very much the founding principle. During the late 1970s degrees at Bachelor's level were introduced, later Master's and Doctoral levels were also allowed. In recent years there has been a rapid expansion in apprenticeship and nursing type courses.

Validation 
Traditionally awards were conferred by the National Council for Educational Awards, this statutory authority became the Higher Education and Training Awards Council, and other awards are conferred by the Further Education and Training Awards Council. Some specialised courses, such as accountancy, are validated by professional bodies but these are nearly always the exception.

Technological Universities

Following the enactment of legislation in 2018, the various institutes of technology began a merger process to create five technological universities:
 Technological University Dublin
 Munster Technological University
 Technological University of the Shannon: Midlands Midwest
 Atlantic Technological University
 South East Technological University

, Dundalk Institute of Technology announced plans to join an existing TU. It had previously investigated the possibility of becoming a TU in its own right.

References

External links 
 Council of Directors of Institutes of Technology

Education in the Republic of Ireland
Universities and colleges in the Republic of Ireland
Science and technology in the Republic of Ireland